A stratocracy (from στρατός, stratos, "army" and κράτος, kratos, "dominion", "power", also stratiocracy) is a form of government headed by military chiefs. The branches of government are administered by military forces, the government is legal under the laws of the jurisdiction at issue, and is usually carried out by military workers.

Description of stratocracy 
The word stratocracy first appeared in 1652 from the political theorist Robert Filmer, being preceded in 1649 by  used by Claudius Salmasius in reference to the newly declared Commonwealth of England. John Bouvier and Daniel Gleason describe a stratocracy as one where citizens with mandatory or voluntary military service, or veterans who have been honorably discharged, have the right to elect or govern. The military's administrative, judicial, and/or legislative powers are supported by law, the constitution, and the society. It does not necessarily need to be autocratic or oligarchic by nature in order to preserve its right to rule. The political scientist Samuel Finer distinguished between stratocracy which was rule by the army and military regimes where the army did not rule but enforced the rule of the civil leaders. Peter Lyon wrote that through history stratocracies have been relatively rare, and that in the latter half of the twentieth century there has been a noticeable increase in the number of stratocratic states due to the "rapid collapse of the West European thalassocracies".

Notable examples of stratocracies

Modern stratocracies 

The closest modern equivalent to a stratocracy, the State Peace and Development Council of Myanmar (Burma), which ruled from 1997 to 2011, arguably differed from most other military dictatorships in that it completely abolished the civilian constitution and legislature. A new constitution that came into effect in 2010 cemented the Tatmadaw's hold on power through mechanisms such as reserving 25% of the seats in the legislature for military personnel. The civilian constitutional government was dissolved again in the 2021 Myanmar coup d'état, with power being transferred back to the Tatmadaw through the State Administration Council. 

The United Kingdom overseas territory, the Sovereign Base Areas of Akrotiri and Dhekelia on the island of Cyprus, provides another example of a stratocracy: British Forces Cyprus governs the territory, with Major-General Robert Thomson serving as administrator from 2019. The territory is subject to unique laws different from both those of the United Kingdom and those of Cyprus.

Historical stratocracies

Sparta 

The Diarchy of Sparta was a stratocratic kingdom. From a young age, male Spartans were put through the agoge, necessary for full-citizenship, which was a rigorous education and training program to prepare them to be warriors. Aristotle describes the kingship at Sparta as "a kind of unlimited and perpetual generalship" (Pol. iii. 1285a), while Isocrates refers to the Spartans as "subject to an oligarchy at home, to a kingship on campaign" (iii. 24).

Rome 
One of the most distinguished and, perhaps, long-lived examples of a stratocratic state, is Ancient Rome, though the stratocratic system developed over time. Following the disposition of the last Roman king Lucius Tarquinius Superbus, Rome became an oligarchic Republic. However, with the gradual expansion of the empire and conflicts with its rival Carthage which eventually led to the Punic wars, the Roman political and military system experienced drastic changes. Following the Marian reforms, de facto political power became concentrated under military leadership, as the loyalty of the legionaries shifted from the Senate to its generals.

Through the First Triumvirate this led to, following a series of civil wars, the formation of the Roman Empire, the head of which was acclaimed as "Imperator", previously an honorary title for distinguished military commanders. Following the formation of the Empire, the Roman Army either approved of or acquiesced in the accession of an emperor, with the Praetorian Guard having a decisive role in the succession until Emperor Constantine abolished it. Militarization of the Empire increased over time and emperors were increasingly beholden to their armies and fleets, yet how active emperors were in actually commanding in the field in military campaigns varied from emperor to emperor, even from dynasty to dynasty. The vital political importance of the army persisted up until the destruction of the Eastern (Byzantine) Empire with the fall of Constantinople in 1453.

Cossacks 

Cossacks were predominantly East Slavic people who became known as members of democratic, semi-military and semi-naval communities, predominantly located in Ukraine and in Southern Russia. They inhabited sparsely populated areas and islands in the lower Dnieper, Don, Terek, and Ural river basins, and played an important role in the historical and cultural development of both Russia and Ukraine. The Zaporozhian Sich was a Cossack semi-autonomous polity and proto-state that existed between the 16th to 18th centuries, and existed as an independent stratocratic state as the Cossack Hetmanate for over a hundred years.

Military frontier of the Habsburg monarchy 
The Military Frontier was a borderland of the Habsburg monarchy (which became the Austrian Empire and later the Austro-Hungarian Empire). The military frontier acted as the cordon sanitaire against incursions from the Ottoman Empire. Located in the southern part of Hungarian crown land, the frontier was separated from local jurisdiction and was under direct Viennese central military administration from the 1500s to 1872. Unlike the rest of the Catholic dominated territory of the empire, the frontier area had relatively freer religious laws in order to attract settlement into the area.

States argued to be stratocratic

USA 

The political scientist Harold Lasswell wrote in 1941 of his concerns that the world was moving towards "a world of 'garrison states with the United States of America being one of the countries moving in that direction. This was supported by the historian Richard Kohn in 1975 commenting on the US's creation of a military state during its early independence, and the political scientist Samuel Fitch in 1985. The historian Eric Hobsbawm has used the existence and power of the military-industrial complex in the US as evidence of it being a stratocratic state. The expansion and prioritisation of the military during the administrations of Reagan and H. W. Bush have also been described as signs of stratocracy in the US. The futurist Paul Saffo and the researcher Robert Marzec have argued that the post 9/11 projection of the United States was trending towards stratocracy.

USSR 
The philosopher and economist Cornelius Castoriadis wrote in his 1980 text, Facing the War, that Russia had become the primary world military power. To sustain this, in the context of the visible economic inferiority of the Soviet Union in the civilian sector, he proposed that the society may no longer be dominated by the one-party state bureaucracy of the Communist Party but by a "stratocracy" describing it as a separate and dominant military sector with expansionist designs on the world. He further argued that this meant there was no internal class dynamic which could lead to social revolution within Russian society and that change could only occur through foreign intervention. Timothy Luke agreed that under the secretaryship of Mikhail Gorbachev this was the USSR moving towards a stratocratic state.

African states 

Various countries in post-colonial Africa have been described as stratocracies. The Republic of Egypt under the leadership of Nasser was described by the political theorist P. J. Vatikiotis as a statocratic state. George commented in a 1988 paper that the military dictatorship of Idi Amin in Uganda and the apartheid regime in South Africa should be considered stratocracies. Various previous Nigerian governments have been described as stratocratic in research, including the government under Olusegun Obasanjo, and the Armed Forces Ruling Council lead by Ibrahim Babangida. Under the 1978 constitution of eSwatini Sobhuza II appointed the Swazi army commander as the country's prime minister, and the second-in-command of the army as the head of the civil service board. This fusing of military and civil power continued in subsequent appointments, with many of the appointees viewing their civil roles as secondary to their military positions. Ghana under Jerry Rawlings has also been described as being stratocratic in nature. Karl Marx's term of barracks socialism was retermed by the political scientist Michel Martin in their description of socialist stratocracies in the Middle East, Latin America, and Africa, including specifically the People's Republic of Benin. Martin also believes the praetorianism of francophone African republics can be called stratocratic, including the Côte d'Ivoire and the Central African Republic.

Other 

The French historian François Raguenet wrote in 1691 of the stratocracy of Oliver Cromwell in the Protectorate, and commented that he believed William III of England was seeking to revive the stratocracy in England.

The Prussian military writer Georg Henirich von Berenhorst wrote in hindsight that ever since the reign of the soldier king, Prussia always remained "not a country with an army, but an army with a country" (a quote often misattributed to Voltaire and Honoré Gabriel Riqueti, comte de Mirabeau). It has been argued the subsequent dominance of the Kingdom of Prussia in the North German Confederation and German Empire and the expansive militarism in their administrations and policies, saw a continuance of the stratocratic Prussian government.

British commentators such as Sir Richard Burton described the pre-Tanzimat Ottoman Empire as a stratocratic state.

The Warlord Era of China is viewed as period of stratocratic struggles with the researcher Peng Xiuliang pointing to the actions and policies of Wang Shizhen, a general and politician of the Republic of China, as an example of the stratocratic forces within the Chinese government of the time.

This government was a stratocratic system where the military was responsible for the political administration of Poland.

Fictional stratocracies 
Stratocratic forms of government have been popular in fictional stories.

 The country of Amestris in the Fullmetal Alchemist manga and anime series is a nominal parliamentary republic without elections, where parliament has been used as a façade to distract from the authoritarian regime, as the government is almost completely centralized by the military, and the majority of government positions are occupied by military personnel.
 Bowser from the Super Mario video game franchise is the supreme leader of a stratocratic empire in which he has many other generals working under his militaristic rules such as Kamek, Private Goomp, Sergeant Guy, Corporal Paraplonk and many others.
 The Cardassian Union of the Star Trek universe can be described as a stratocracy, with a constitutionally and socially sanctioned, as well as a politically dominant military that nonetheless has immense totalitarian characteristics.
 In Bryan Konietzko and Michael Dante DiMartino's Avatar: The Last Airbender, the Earth Kingdom is very divided and during the Hundred Year War relies on an unofficial confederal stratocratic rule of small towns to maintain control from the Fire Nation's military, without the Earth Monarch's assistance.
 Both Eldia and Marley from the Japanese manga and anime series Attack On Titan are stratocratic nations ruled by military governments. After a coup d'état, the government of Eldia was displaced in favor of a military-led system with a puppet monarchy as its public front.
 The Galactic Empire from the original Star Wars trilogy can be described as a stratocracy. Although ruled by Emperor Palpatine, the functioning of the entire government was controlled by the military and explicitly sanctioned by its leaders. All sectors were controlled by a Moff or Grand Moff who were also high-ranking military officers.
 The Global Defense Initiative from the Command & Conquer franchise is another example: initially being a United Nations task force to combat the Brotherhood of Nod and research the alien substance Tiberium, later expanding to a worldwide government led by military leaders after the collapse of society due to Tiberium's devastating effects on Earth.
 Blizzard Entertainment's World of Warcraft features an antagonistic group of Orcish clans, which joined in the formation of The Iron Horde, a militaristic clan governed by warlords.
 In Robert A. Heinlein's Starship Troopers, the Terran Federation was set up by a group of military veterans in Aberdeen, Scotland when governments collapsed following a world war. While national service is voluntary, earning citizenship in the Federation requires civilians to "enroll in the Federal Service of the Terran Federation for a term of not less than two years and as much longer as may be required by the needs of the Service." While Federal Service is not exclusively military service, that appears to be the dominant form. It is believed that only those willing to sacrifice their lives on the state's behalf are fit to govern. While the government is a representative democracy, the franchise is only granted to people who have completed service, mostly in the military, due to this law (active military can neither vote nor serve in political/non-military offices).
 The Turian Hierarchy of Mass Effect is another example of a fictional stratocracy, where the civilian and military populations cannot be distinguished, and the government and the military are the same, and strongly meritocratic, with designated responsibilities for everyone.
 The five members of Greater Turkiye in the manga and anime Altair: A Record of Battles are called stratocracies, with them being based on the Ottoman Empire.

See also 
 Junta (governing body)
 Militarism
 Military dictatorship
 Military government:
 Military dictatorship
 Military junta
 Military occupation

References

Bibliography 
 
 
 
 
 

Authoritarianism
Forms of government
Militarism
Military sociology